David H. Evans (December 7, 1837 – February 24, 1920) was an American politician from New York.

Life
Evans was born in Tyre, Seneca County, New York, the son of John G. Evans (1793–1877) and Mary (Hess) Evans (died 1875). He attended the common schools and Fort Plain Seminary. Then he taught school for some time, and worked on the family farm. On February 24, 1864, he married Catherine Wurts (1840–1885), and they had five children.

In politics, he was a Republican. He was a Justice of the Peace from 1866 to 1869; and Supervisor of the Town of Tyre in 1869, and from 1872 to 1877.

He was a member of the New York State Assembly (Seneca Co.) in 1879 and 1880.

He was a member of the New York State Senate (26th D.) in 1882 and 1883.

In 1893, he married Catherine (Stephens) Ransom.

He died on February 24, 1920, at the farm where he was born, located in the Town of Tyre, about four miles south-west of the Village of Savannah; and was buried at the Evans Corner Cemetery in Tyre.

References

 Civil List and Constitutional History of the Colony and State of New York compiled by Edgar Albert Werner (1884; pg. 291 and 378f)
 The State Government for 1879 by Charles G. Shanks (Weed, Parsons & Co, Albany, 1879)
 Portrait and Biographical Record of Seneca and Schuyler Counties, New York (e-book)
 SENATOR DAVID H. EVANS, OF TYRE, PASSES AWAY in The Savannah Times on February 27, 1920
 Evans Corner Cemetery transcriptions at RootsWeb

1837 births
1920 deaths
Republican Party New York (state) state senators
People from Tyre, New York
Republican Party members of the New York State Assembly
Town supervisors in New York (state)
People from Fort Plain, New York